The Bastards is a 2007 Romanian drama film directed by Șerban Marinescu. It is about the upper echelons of Romanian politics.

Synopsis 
Didi Sfiosu, nicknamed "Hero of the Barricade", is a former revolutionary who serves as key advisor to the Romanian President. Dandu Patricianul is a wealthy businessman who has financed the ruling political Party at the last electoral campaign, but now is alleged to support the opposition.

Mister Pompi is Romanian Prime Minister, with the help of a clever advisor named Pejbeanu and a former "Securitate Agent" named Romanescu, controls and spies upon Patricianu's moves. He discovers a plot that involves Patricianu himself, an opposition senator and the ambitious and powerful General Dorobandu. Helped by an up-and-coming reporter, they want to prove that corruption has reached the cabinet, in order to turn the tide of public opinion and to propose the general as the next Chief of state. 

Then Sfiosu, warned about this situation, arranges a meeting between Dandu and the Premier in order to reach an agreement; but this meeting fails. The Prime Minister decides to make a risky move; without notifying Sfiosu, he orders a complacent Magistrate  to send an arrest warrant to Patricianu.
Sfiosu gets angry about and speaks directly to the President of Republic, asking for the immediate release of Patricianu; Sfiosu knows that Dandu is the only one able to finance the next campaign. 
However, Dandu Patricianul is freed because of a lack of evidence but the Premier and his faithful advisor understand that Sfiosu is more influential and informed than predicted. 

Pompi, always advised by Pejbeanu, does a desperate move to avoid a thunderous defeat: he tries to "buy" both the senator and the reporter, eventually offering to the general anything in exchange of his withdrawal from the electoral run; General Dorobandu not only rejects the deal, he subtly threatens Pompi with a merciless revenge as soon as he's elected.
Then Pompi decides a kind of "Final Solution": the assassination of the General during a hunting session. 
Didi Sfiosu is disgusted by those happenings, so he symbolically buries the revolution under a pile of garbage by planting a cross with his name on it and putting on the cross the only two items reminding him of the revolution; a foulard and a bandannah. The meaning is clear: this democracy is bad, at least, at the same way of the dictatorship.

Cast 
 Ștefan Iordache - Didi Sfiosu
 Dorel Vișan - Dandu Patricianul
 Horațiu Mălăele - Pompi
 Răzvan Vasilescu - General Dorobanțu
 Gheorghe Dinică - Romanescu
  - Dandu's mistress
 Mircea Albulescu - restaurant owner
 Mitică Popescu - Marian
  - opposition senator
  - Ionel Iancu
  - Ionel (President of Romania)
 Dan Diaconescu - himself

References

External links 

2007 drama films
2007 films
Romanian drama films
2000s Romanian-language films